Ballysteen GAA is a Gaelic Athletic Association club based in Ballysteen, Limerick, Ireland. The club participates in competitions organized by Limerick GAA.

Ballysteen Roll of Honour

 Limerick Senior Football Championship (1) 1964
 Limerick Intermediate Football Championship (1) 2008
 Limerick Junior A Football Championship (3) 1946, 1961, 1979
 Limerick Junior B Football Championship (1) 2001
 Limerick Junior A Football League (1) 2001
 Limerick Minor B Football Championship (1) 2008
 Limerick Under-21 B Football Championship (1) 2012
 Limerick Senior Football Cup (1) 1963
 West Limerick Senior Football Championship (2) 2013, 2017
 West Limerick Intermediate Football Championship (1) 2004
 West Limerick Junior A Football Championship (10) 1932, 1935, 1936, 1940, 1942, 1943, 1944, 1946, 1961, 1992
 West Limerick Junior B Football Championship (2) 2001, 2014
 West Limerick Junior A Football League (2) 2001, 2002
 West Limerick Junior B Football League (4) 1997, 2000, 2001, 2015
 West Limerick Minor B Football Championship (1) 2008
 West Limerick Minor A Football Championship (2) 2015 and 2013 as Ballysteen/St Senans
 West Limerick Under-21 B Football Championship (2) 2011, 2012

References

External links
Ballysteen GAA site

[Ballysteengaa.ie]

Gaelic football clubs in County Limerick
Gaelic games clubs in County Limerick